The graphics display resolution is the width and height dimension of an electronic visual display device, measured in pixels. This information is used for electronic devices such as a computer monitor. Certain combinations of width and height are standardized (e.g. by VESA) and typically given a name and an initialism that is descriptive of its dimensions. A graphics display resolution can be used in tandem with the size of the graphics display to calculate pixel density. An increase in the pixel density often correlates with a decrease in the size of individual pixels on a display.

Overview by vertical resolution and aspect ratio

Aspect ratio 

The favored aspect ratio of mass-market display industry products has changed gradually from 4:3, then to 16:10, then to 16:9, and is now changing to 18:9 for smartphones. The 4:3 aspect ratio generally reflects older products, especially the era of the cathode ray tube (CRT). The 16:10 aspect ratio had its largest use in the 1995–2010 period, and the 16:9 aspect ratio tends to reflect post-2010 mass-market computer monitor, laptop, and entertainment products displays.

The 4:3 aspect ratio was common in older television cathode ray tube (CRT) displays, which were not easily adaptable to a wider aspect ratio. When good quality alternate technologies (i.e., liquid crystal displays (LCDs) and plasma displays) became more available and less costly, around the year 2000, the common computer displays and entertainment products moved to a wider aspect ratio, first to the 16:10 ratio. The 16:10 ratio allowed some compromise between showing older 4:3 aspect ratio broadcast TV shows, but also allowing better viewing of widescreen movies. However, around the year 2005, home entertainment displays (i.e., TV sets) gradually moved from 16:10 to the 16:9 aspect ratio, for further improvement of viewing widescreen movies. By about 2007, virtually all mass-market entertainment displays were 16:9. In 2011,  (Full HD, the native resolution of Blu-ray) was the favored resolution in the most heavily marketed entertainment market displays. The next standard,  (4K UHD), was first sold in 2013.

The computer display industry maintained the 16:10 aspect ratio longer than the entertainment industry, but in the 2005–2010 period, computers were increasingly marketed as dual-use products, with uses in the traditional computer applications, but also as means of viewing entertainment content. In this time frame, with the notable exception of Apple, almost all desktop, laptop, and display manufacturers gradually moved to promoting only 16:9 aspect ratio displays. By 2011, the 16:10 aspect ratio had virtually disappeared from the Windows laptop display market (although Mac laptops are still mostly 16:10, including the  15" Retina MacBook Pro and the  13" Retina MacBook Pro). One consequence of this transition was that the highest available resolutions moved generally downward (i.e., the move from  laptop displays to  displays).

In response to usability flaws of now common 16:9 displays in office/professional applications, Microsoft and Huawei started to offer notebooks with a 3:2 aspect ratio. By 2021, Huawei also offers a monitor display offering this aspect ratio, targeted towards professional uses.

High-definition

All standard HD resolutions share a  aspect ratio, although some derived resolutions with smaller or larger ratios also exist. Most of the narrower resolutions are only used for storing, not for displaying videos.

(nHD) 
nHD (ninth HD) is a display resolution of  pixels, which is exactly one-ninth of a Full HD (1080p) frame and one-quarter of a HD (720p) frame. Pixel doubling (vertically and horizontally) nHD frames will form one 720p frame and pixel tripling nHD frames will form one 1080p frame.

One drawback of this resolution regarding encoding is that the number of lines is not an even multiple of 16, which is a common macroblock size for video codecs. H.264 codecs have this padding and cropping ability built-in as standard. The same is true for qHD and 1080p but the relative amount of padding is more for lower resolutions such as nHD.

When such video streams are either encoded from HD frames or played back on HD displays in full-screen mode (either 720p or 1080p) they are scaled by non-integer scale factors. True nHD frames on the other hand has integer scale factors, for example Nokia 808 PureView with nHD display.

(qHD) 
Note: qHD is quarter HD; QHD is quad HD
qHD is a display resolution of  pixels, which is exactly one-quarter of a Full HD (1080p) frame, in a 16:9 aspect ratio.

One of the few tabletop TVs to use this as its native resolution was the Sony XEL-1. Similar to DVGA, this resolution became popular for high-end smartphone displays in early 2011. Mobile phones including the Jolla, Sony Xperia C, HTC Sensation, Motorola Droid RAZR, LG Optimus L9, Microsoft Lumia 535 and Samsung Galaxy S4 Mini have displays with the qHD resolution, as does the PlayStation Vita portable game system.

(HD) 

The HD resolution of  pixels stems from high-definition television (HDTV), where it originally used 50 or 60 frames per second. With its 16:9 aspect ratio, it is exactly 2 times the width and 1 times the height of 4:3 VGA, which shares its aspect ratio and 480 line count with NTSC. HD, therefore, has exactly 3 times as many pixels as VGA, i.e. almost 1 megapixel.

This resolution is often referred to as 720p, although the p (which stands for progressive scan and is important for transmission formats) is irrelevant for labeling digital display resolutions.

In the mid-2000s, when the digital HD technology and standard debuted on the market, this type of resolution was often referred to by the branded name HD ready or HDr for short, which had specified it as a minimum resolution for devices to qualify for the certification. However, few screens have been built that use this resolution natively. Most employ 16:9 panels with 768 lines instead (WXGA), which resulted in odd numbers of pixels per line, i.e. 1365 are rounded to 1360, 1364, 1366 or even 1376, the next multiple of 16.

is the resolution of Panasonic's DVCPRO HD Format, as well as DV Camcorders using this format, and their TFT LCD screens. It has an aspect ratio of 32:27 (1.:1), an approximate of Movietone cameras of the 1930s. In 2007, Hitachi released a few 42" and 50" television models at this resolution.

(HD+) 
The HD+ (HD Plus) resolution of  pixels in a 16:9 aspect ratio is often referred to as 900p.

(FHD) 

FHD (Full HD) is the resolution used by the 1080p and 1080i HDTV video formats. It has a 16:9 aspect ratio and 2,073,600 total pixels, i.e. very close to 2 megapixels, and is exactly 50% larger than 720p HD in each dimension for a total of 2.25 times as many pixels. When using interlacing, the uncompressed bandwidth requirements are similar to those of 720p at the same field rate (a 12.5% increase, as one field of 1080i video is 1,036,800 pixels, and one frame of 720p video is 921,600 pixels). Although the number of pixels is the same for 1080p and 1080i, the effective resolution is somewhat lower for the interlaced format, as it is necessary to use some vertical low-pass filtering to reduce temporal artifacts such as interline twitter.

(DCI 2K) 

DCI 2K is a standardized format established by the Digital Cinema Initiatives consortium in 2005 for 2K video projection. This format has a resolution of  (2.2 megapixels) with an aspect ratio of 256:135 (1.8:1). This is the native resolution for DCI-compliant 2K digital projectors and displays.

is a resolution used by many smartphones since 2018. It has an aspect ratio of 18:9, matching that of the Univisium film format.

This resolution is equivalent to a Full HD extended in width by 33%, with an aspect ratio of 64:27 (2., or 21.:9). It is sometimes referred to as "1080p ultrawide" or "UW-FHD" (ultrawide FHD). Monitors at this resolution usually contain built-in firmware to divide the screen into two  screens.

(QHD) 

Note: qHD is quarter HD; QHD is quad HD

QHD (Quad HD), WQHD (Wide Quad HD), or 1440p, is a display resolution of  pixels in a 16:9 aspect ratio. The name QHD reflects the fact that it has four times as many pixels as HD (720p). It is also commonly called WQHD, to emphasize it being a wide resolution, although that is technically unnecessary, since the HD resolutions are all wide. One advantage of using "WQHD" is avoiding confusion with qHD with a small q.

This resolution was under consideration by the ATSC in the late 1980s to become the standard HDTV format, because it is exactly 4 times the width and 3 times the height of VGA, which has the same number of lines as NTSC signals at the SDTV 4:3 aspect ratio. Pragmatic technical constraints made them choose the now well-known 16:9 formats with twice (HD) and thrice (FHD) the VGA width instead.

In October 2006, Chi Mei Optoelectronics (CMO) announced a 47-inch 1440p LCD panel to be released in Q2 2007; the panel was planned to finally debut at FPD International 2008 in a form of autostereoscopic 3D display. As of the end of 2013, monitors with this resolution were becoming more common.

The 27-inch version of the Apple Cinema Display monitor introduced in July 2010 has a native resolution of 2560 × 1440, as does its successor, the 27-inch Apple Thunderbolt Display.

The resolution is also used in portable devices. In September 2012, Samsung announced the Series 9 WQHD laptop with a 13-inch  display. In August 2013, LG announced a 5.5-inch QHD smartphone display, which was used in the LG G3. In October 2013 Vivo announced a smartphone with a  display.
Other phone manufacturers followed in 2014, such as Samsung with the Galaxy Note 4, and Google and Motorola with the Nexus 6 smartphone. By the mid-2010s, it was a common resolution among flagship phones such as the HTC 10, the Lumia 950, and the Galaxy S6 and S7.

(QHD+) 
This resolution has a 16:9 aspect ratio, and is exactly four times as many pixels as the  HD+ resolution. It has been referred to as WQXGA+, QHD and QHD+ by various different companies.

The first products announced to use this resolution were the 2013 HP Envy 14 TouchSmart Ultrabook and the 13.3-inch Samsung Ativ Q.

This resolution is equivalent to QHD extended in width by 34%, giving it an aspect ratio of 43:18 (2.3:1, or 21.5:9; commonly marketed as simply "21:9"). The first monitor to support this resolution was the 34-inch LG 34UM95-P. LG uses the term UW-QHD to describe this resolution. This monitor was first released in Germany in late December 2013, before being officially announced at CES 2014.

This resolution is equivalent to two Full HD displays side by side or one vertical half of a 4K UHD display. It has an aspect ratio of 32:9 (3.:1), close to the 3.6:1 ratio of IMAX UltraWideScreen 3.6. Samsung monitors at this resolution contain built-in firmware to divide the screen into two  screens, or one  and one  screen.

This resolution has a 12:5 aspect ratio (2.4:1, or 21.6:9; commonly marketed as simply "21:9"). It is equivalent to WQXGA extended in width by 50%, or 4K UHD reduced in height by 26%. This resolution is commonly encountered in cinematic 4K content that has been cropped vertically to a widescreen 2.4:1 aspect ratio. The first monitor to support this resolution was the 37.5-inch LG 38UC99-W. Other vendors followed, with Dell U3818DW, HP Z38c, and Acer XR382CQK. This resolution is referred to as UW4K, WQHD+, UWQHD+, or QHD+, though no single name is agreed upon.

(4K UHD) 

This resolution, sometimes referred to as 4K UHD or 4K2K, has a 16:9 aspect ratio and 8,294,400 pixels. It is double the size of Full HD in both dimensions for a total of four times as many pixels, and triple the size of HD in both dimensions for a total of nine times as many pixels. It is the lowest common multiple of the HDTV resolutions.

 was chosen as the resolution of the UHDTV1 format defined in SMPTE ST 2036-1, as well as the 4K UHDTV system defined in ITU-R BT.2020 and the UHD-1 broadcast standard from DVB. It is also the minimum resolution requirement for CEA's definition of an Ultra HD display. Before the publication of these standards, it was sometimes casually referred to as QFHD (Quad Full HD).

The first commercial displays capable of this resolution include an 82-inch LCD TV revealed by Samsung in early 2008, the Sony SRM-L560, a 56-inch LCD reference monitor announced in October 2009, an 84-inch display demonstrated by LG in mid-2010, and a 27.84-inch 158PPI 4K IPS monitor for medical purposes launched by Innolux in November 2010. In October 2011 Toshiba announced the REGZA 55x3, which is claimed to be the first 4K glasses-free 3D TV.

When support for 4K at 60Hz was added in DisplayPort 1.2, no DisplayPort timing controllers (TCONs) existed which were capable of processing the necessary amount of data from a single video stream. As a result, the first 4K monitors from 2013 and early 2014, such as the Sharp PN-K321, Asus PQ321Q, and Dell UP2414Q and UP3214Q, were addressed internally as two  monitors side by side instead of a single display and made use of DisplayPort's Multi-Stream Transport (MST) feature to multiplex a separate signal for each half over the connection, splitting the data between two timing controllers. Newer timing controllers became available in 2014, and after mid-2014 new 4K monitors such as the Asus PB287Q no longer rely on MST tiling technique to achieve 4K at 60Hz, instead, using the standard SST (Single-Stream Transport) approach.

In 2015, Sony announced the Xperia Z5 Premium, the first smartphone with a 4K display, and in 2017 Sony announced the Xperia XZ Premium, the first smartphone with a 4K HDR display.

(DCI 4K) 
, referred to as DCI 4K, Cinema 4K or 4K2K, is the resolution used by the 4K container format defined by the Digital Cinema Initiatives Digital Cinema System Specification, a prominent standard in the cinema industry. This resolution has an aspect ratio of 256:135 (1.8:1), and 8,847,360 total pixels. This is the native resolution for DCI 4K digital projectors and displays.

This resolution is equivalent to 4K UHD extended in width by 33%, giving it a 64:27 aspect ratio (2. or 21.:9, commonly marketed as simply "21:9") and 11,059,200 total pixels. The first displays to support this resolution were 105-inch televisions, the LG 105UC9 and the Samsung UN105S9W. In December 2017, LG announced a 34-inch  monitor, the 34WK95U, and in January 2021 the 40-inch 40WP95C. LG refers to this resolution as 5K2K WUHD.

(5K) 

Although it is not established by any of the UHDTV standards, some manufacturers such as Dell have referred to it as UHD+. It is exactly double the pixel count of QHD in both dimensions for a total of four times as many pixels, and is 33% larger than 4K UHD in both dimensions for a total of 1. times as many pixels. The line count of 2880 is also the least common multiple of 480 and 576, the scanline count of NTSC and PAL, respectively. Such a resolution can vertically scale SD content to fit by natural numbers (6 for NTSC and 5 for PAL). Horizontal scaling of SD is always fractional (non-anamorphic: 5.33...5.47, anamorphic: 7.11...7.29).

The first display with this resolution was the Dell UltraSharp UP2715K, announced on September 5, 2014. On October 16, 2014, Apple announced the iMac with Retina 5K display.

DisplayPort version 1.3 added support for 5K at 60Hz over a single cable, whereas DisplayPort1.2 was only capable of 5K at 30Hz. Early 5K 60Hz displays such as the Dell UltraSharp UP2715K and HP DreamColor Z27q that lacked DisplayPort1.3 support required two DisplayPort1.2 connections to operate at 60Hz, in a tiled display mode similar to early 4K displays using DP MST.

Other resolution with the same 5120-pixel width, which is the lowest common multiple of popular 1024 and 1280, but a different aspect ratio have also been called "5K" and some nominal 5K resolutions are just 4800 pixels wide, which is the lowest common multiple of 960 and 800.

(8K UHD) 

This resolution, sometimes referred to as 8K UHD, has a 16:9 aspect ratio and 33,177,600 pixels. It is exactly double the size of 4K UHD in each dimension for a total of four times as many pixels, and Quadruple the size of Full HD in each dimension for a total of sixteen times as many pixels.  was chosen as the resolution of the UHDTV2 format defined in SMPTE ST 2036-1, as well as the 8K UHDTV system defined in ITU-R BT.2020 and the UHD-2 broadcast standard from DVB.

VESA's Display Stream Compression (DSC), which was part of early DisplayPort1.3 drafts and would have enabled 8K at 60Hz without subsampling, was cut from the specification prior to publication of the final draft.

DSC support was reintroduced with the publication of DisplayPort1.4 in March 2016.

(16K) 

Sony introduced a  commercial 16K display at NAB 2019 that is set to be released in Japan. It is made up of 576 modules (360 × 360p), in a formation of 48 by 12 modules, forming a 17280 × 4320 screen, with 4:1 aspect ratio.

Video Graphics Array

(QQVGA) 
The term Quarter-QVGA signifies a resolution of one fourth the number of pixels in a QVGA display (half the number of vertical and half the number of horizontal pixels) which itself has one fourth the number of pixels in a VGA display.

The abbreviation qqVGA may be used to distinguish quarter from quad, just like qVGA.

(HQVGA) 
This resolution is half of QVGA, which is itself a quarter of VGA, which is  pixels.

(QVGA) 

Quarter VGA (QVGA or qVGA) is a popular term for a computer display with  display resolution. QVGA displays were most often used in mobile phones, personal digital assistants (PDA), and some handheld game consoles.

The name comes from having a quarter of the  maximum resolution of the original IBM Video Graphics Array display technology, which became a de facto industry standard in the late 1980s. QVGA is not a standard mode offered by the VGA BIOS, even though VGA and compatible chipsets support a QVGA-sized Mode X. The term refers only to the display's resolution and thus the abbreviated term QVGA or Quarter VGA is more appropriate to use.

QVGA resolution is also used in digital video recording equipment as a low-resolution mode requiring less data storage capacity than higher resolutions, typically in still digital cameras with video recording capability, and some mobile phones. Each frame is an image of  pixels. QVGA video is typically recorded at 15 or 30 frames per second. QVGA mode describes the size of an image in pixels, commonly called the resolution; numerous video file formats support this resolution.

While QVGA is a lower resolution than VGA, at higher resolutions the "Q" prefix commonly means quad(ruple) or four times higher display resolution (e.g., QXGA is four times higher resolution than XGA). To distinguish quarter from quad, lowercase "q" is sometimes used for "quarter" and uppercase "Q" for "Quad", by analogy with SI prefixes like m/M and p/P, but this is not a consistent usage.

Some examples of devices that use QVGA display resolution include the iPod Classic, Samsung i5500, LG Optimus L3-E400, Galaxy Fit, Y and Pocket, HTC Wildfire, Sony Ericsson Xperia X10 Mini and Mini pro and Nintendo 3DS' bottom screen.

(WQVGA) 

Wide QVGA or WQVGA is any display resolution having the same height in pixels as QVGA, but wider. This definition is consistent with other 'wide' versions of computer displays.

As with WVGA, exact ratios of n:9 are difficult because of the way VGA controllers internally deal with pixels. For instance, when using graphical combinatorial operations on pixels, VGA controllers will use 1 bit per pixel. Since bits cannot be accessed individually but by chunks of 16 or an even higher power of 2, this limits the horizontal resolution to a 16-pixel granularity, i.e., the horizontal resolution must be divisible by 16. In the case of the 16:9 ratio, with 240 pixels high, the horizontal resolution should be 240 / 9 × 16 = 426., the closest multiple of 16 is 432.

WQVGA has also been used to describe displays that are not 240 pixels high, for example, Sixteenth HD1080 displays which are 480 pixels wide and 270 or 272 pixels high. This may be due to WQVGA having the nearest screen height.

For example, the Hyundai MB 490i, Sony Ericsson Aino and the Samsung Instinct have WQVGA screen resolutions – . Other devices such as the Apple iPod Nano also use a WQVGA screen,  pixels.

(HVGA) 

HVGA (Half-size VGA) screens have  pixels (3:2 aspect ratio),  pixels (4:3 aspect ratio),  (≈16:9 aspect ratio), or  pixels (8:3 aspect ratio). The former is used by a variety of PDA devices, starting with the Sony CLIÉ PEG-NR70 in 2002, and standalone PDAs by Palm. The latter was used by a variety of handheld PC devices.

Examples of devices that use HVGA include the Apple iPhone (1st generation through 3GS), iPod Touch (1st Generation through 3rd), BlackBerry Bold 9000, HTC Dream, Hero, Wildfire S, LG GW620 Eve, MyTouch 3G Slide, Nokia 6260 Slide, Palm Pre, Samsung M900 Moment, Sony Ericsson Xperia X8, mini, mini pro, active and live and the Sony PlayStation Portable.

Texas Instruments produces the DLP pico projector which supports HVGA resolution.

HVGA was the only resolution supported in the first versions of Google Android, up to release 1.5. Other higher and lower resolutions became available starting on release 1.6, like the popular WVGA resolution on the Motorola Droid or the QVGA resolution on the HTC Tattoo.

Three-dimensional computer graphics common on television throughout the 1980s were mostly rendered at this resolution, causing objects to have jagged edges on the top and bottom when edges were not anti-aliased.

(VGA) 

Video Graphics Array (VGA) refers specifically to the display hardware first introduced with the IBM PS/2 line of computers in 1987. Through its widespread adoption, VGA has also come to mean either an analog computer display standard, the 15-pin D-subminiature VGA connector, or the  resolution itself. While the VGA resolution was superseded in the personal computer market in the 1990s and the SEGA Dreamcast in 1998, it became a popular resolution on mobile devices in the 2000s. VGA is still the universal fallback troubleshooting mode in the case of trouble with graphic device drivers in operating systems.

(WVGA) 

It is a common resolution among LCD projectors and later portable and hand-held internet-enabled devices (such as MID and Netbooks) as it is capable of rendering websites designed for an 800 wide window in full page-width. Examples of hand-held internet devices, without phone capability, with this resolution include: Spice stellar nhance mi-435, ASUS Eee PC 700 series, Dell XCD35, Nokia 770, N800, and N810. 

Mobile phones with WVGA display resolution are also common.

(FWVGA) 
FWVGA is an abbreviation for Full Wide Video Graphics Array which refers to a display resolution of  pixels.  is approximately the 16:9 aspect ratio of anamorphically "un-squeezed" NTSC DVD widescreen video and is considered a "safe" resolution that does not crop any of the image. It is called Full WVGA to distinguish it from other, narrower WVGA resolutions which require cropping 16:9 aspect ratio high-definition video (i.e. it is full width, albeit with a considerable reduction in size).

The 854 pixel width is rounded up from 853.:
.
Since a pixel must be a whole number, rounding up to 854 ensures inclusion of the entire image.

In 2010, mobile phones with FWVGA display resolution started to become more common. A list of mobile phones with FWVGA displays is available. In addition, the Wii U GamePad that comes with the Nintendo Wii U gaming console includes a 6.2-inch FWVGA display.

(SVGA)  

Super Video Graphics Array, abbreviated to Super VGA or SVGA, also known as Ultra Video Graphics Array, abbreviated to Ultra VGA or UVGA, is a broad term that covers a wide range of computer display standards.

Originally, it was an extension to the VGA standard first released by IBM in 1987. Unlike VGA – a purely IBM-defined standard – Super VGA was defined by the Video Electronics Standards Association (VESA), an open consortium set up to promote interoperability and define standards. When used as a resolution specification, in contrast to VGA or XGA for example, the term SVGA normally refers to a resolution of  pixels.

The marginally higher resolution  is the highest 4:3 resolution not greater than 219 pixels, with its horizontal dimension a multiple of 32 pixels. This enables it to fit within a framebuffer of 512KB (512 × 2 bytes), and the common multiple of 32 pixels constraint is related to alignment. For these reasons, this resolution was available on the Macintosh LC III and other systems.

(DVGA) 
DVGA (Double-size VGA) screens have  pixels (3:2 aspect ratio). Both dimensions are double that of HVGA, hence the pixel count is quadrupled.

Examples of devices that use DVGA include the Meizu MX mobile phone and the Apple iPhone 4 and 4S with the iPod Touch 4, where the screen is called the "Retina Display".

,  (WSVGA) 

The wide version of SVGA is known as WSVGA (Wide Super VGA or Wide SVGA), featured on Ultra-Mobile PCs, netbooks, and tablet computers. It has full XGA width of 1024 pixels. 
Although digital broadcast content in former PAL/SECAM regions has 576 active lines, several mobile TV sets with a DVB-T2 tuner use the 600-line variant with a diameter of 7, 9 or 10 inches (18 to 26 cm).

Extended Graphics Array

(XGA) 

The Extended Graphics Array (XGA) is an IBM display standard introduced in 1990. Later it became the most common appellation of the  pixels display resolution, but the official definition is broader than that. 

The initial version of XGA expanded upon IBM's older VGA by adding support for four new screen modes, including one new resolution:
  pixels in direct 16 bits-per-pixel (65,536 color) RGB hi-color and 8bit/px (256 color) palette-indexed mode.
  pixels with a 16- or 256-color (4 or 8bit/px) palette, using a low frequency interlaced refresh rate.

XGA-2 added a 24-bit DAC, but this was used only to extend the available master palette in 256-color mode, e.g. to allow true 256-greyscale output. Other improvements included the provision of the previously missing  resolution in up to 65,536 colors, faster screen refresh rates in all modes (including non-interlace, flicker-free output for ), and improved accelerator performance and versatility.

All standard XGA modes have a 4:3 aspect ratio with square pixels, although this does not hold for certain standard VGA and third-party extended modes.

and similar (WXGA) 

Wide XGA (WXGA) is a set of non-standard resolutions derived from the XGA display standard by widening it to a widescreen aspect ratio. WXGA is commonly used for low-end LCD TVs and LCD computer monitors for widescreen presentation. The exact resolution offered by a device described as "WXGA" can be somewhat variable owing to a proliferation of several closely related timings optimised for different uses and derived from different bases.

The basis for this otherwise odd seeming resolution is similar to that of other "wide" standards – the line scan (refresh) rate of the well-established "XGA" standard ( pixels, 4:3 aspect) extended to give square pixels on the increasingly popular 16:9 widescreen display ratio without having to effect major signalling changes other than a faster pixel clock, or manufacturing changes other than extending panel width by one third. As 768 is not divisible by 9, the aspect ratio is not quite 16:9 – this would require a horizontal width of 1365 pixels. However, at only 0.05%, the resulting error is insignificant.

In 2006,  was the most popular resolution for liquid crystal display televisions (versus XGA for Plasma TVs flat panel displays); by 2013, even this was relegated to only being used in smaller or cheaper displays (e.g.

For example, at 32-bit color, a  framebuffer would require only 4MB, whilst a  one may need 5, 6 or even 8MB depending on the exact display circuitry architecture and available chip capacities. The 6-pixel reduction also means each line's width is divisible by 8 pixels, simplifying numerous routines used in both computer and broadcast/theatrical video processing, which operate on 8-pixel blocks. Historically, many video cards also mandated screen widths divisible by 8 for their lower-color, planar modes to accelerate memory accesses and simplify pixel position calculations (e.g. fetching 4-bit pixels from 32-bit memory is much faster when performed 8 pixels at a time, and calculating exactly where a particular pixel is within a memory block is much easier when lines do not end partway through a memory word), and this convention persisted in low-end hardware even into the early days of widescreen, LCD HDTVs; thus, most 1366-width displays also quietly support display of 1360-width material, with a thin border of unused pixel columns at each side. This narrower mode is of course even further removed from the 16:9 ideal, but the error is still less than 0.5% (technically, the mode is either 15.94:9.00 or 16.00:9.04) and should be imperceptible.

When referring to laptop displays or independent displays and projectors intended primarily for use with computers, WXGA is also used to describe a resolution of  pixels, with an aspect ratio of 16:10. This was once particularly popular for laptop screens, usually with a diagonal screen size of between 12 and 15 inches, as it provided a useful compromise between 4:3 XGA and 16:9 WXGA, with improved resolution in both dimensions vs. the old standard (especially useful in portrait mode, or for displaying two standard pages of text side by side), a perceptibly "wider" appearance and the ability to display 720p HD video "native" with only very thin letterbox borders (usable for on-screen playback controls) and no stretching. Additionally, like , it required only 1000KB (just under 1MB) of memory per 8-bit channel; thus, a typical double-buffered 32-bit colour screen could fit within 8MB, limiting everyday demands on the complexity (and cost, energy use) of integrated graphics chipsets and their shared use of typically sparse system memory (generally allocated to the video system in relatively large blocks), at least when only the internal display was in use (external monitors generally being supported in "extended desktop" mode to at least  resolution). 16:10 (or 8:5) is itself a rather "classic" computer aspect ratio, harking back to early  modes (and their derivatives) as seen in the Commodore 64, IBM CGA card and others. However, as of mid-2013, this standard is becoming increasingly rare, crowded out by the more standardised and thus more economical-to-produce  panels, as its previously beneficial features become less important with improvements to hardware, gradual loss of general backwards software compatibility, and changes in interface layout. As of August 2013, the market availability of panels with  native resolution had been generally relegated to data projectors or niche products such as convertible tablet PCs and LCD-based eBook readers.

Others 
Additionally, at least two other resolutions are sometimes labelled as WXGA:

 First, the HDTV-standard  (otherwise commonly described as "720p"), which offers an exact 16:9 aspect with square pixels; naturally, it displays standard 720p HD video material without stretching or letterboxing and 1080i/1080p with a simple 2:3 downscale. This resolution has found some use in tablets and modern, high-pixel-density mobile phones, as well as small-format "netbook" or "ultralight" laptop computers. However, its use is uncommon in larger, mainstream devices as it has an insufficient vertical resolution for the proper use of modern operating systems such as Windows 7 whose UI design assumes a minimum of 768 lines. For certain uses such as word processing, it can even be considered a slight downgrade (reducing the number of simultaneously visible lines of text without granting any significant benefit as even 640 pixels is sufficient horizontal resolution to legibly render a full page width, especially with the addition of subpixel anti-aliasing).
Its square-pixel aspect ratio is 15:9, in contrast to HDTV's 16:9 and 's 16:10. It is also the lowest resolution that might be found in an "Ultrabook" standard laptop, as it satisfies the minimum horizontal and vertical pixel resolutions required to officially qualify for the designation.
In Microsoft Windows operating system specifically, the larger taskbar of Windows 7 occupies an additional 16-pixel lines by default, which may compromise the usability of programs that already demanded a full  (instead of, e.g. ) unless it is specifically set to use small icons; an "oddball" 784-line resolution would compensate for this, but  has a simpler aspect and also gives the slight bonus of 16 more usable lines. Also, the Windows Sidebar in Windows Vista and 7 can use the additional 256 or 336 horizontal pixels to display informational "widgets" without compromising the display width of other programs, and Windows 8 is specifically designed around a "two-pane" concept where the full 16:9 or 16:10 screen is not required. Typically, this consists of a 4:3 main program area (typically ,  or ) plus a narrow sidebar running a second program, showing a toolbox for the main program or a pop-out OS shortcut panel taking up the remainder.
 Some  resolution displays have also been found labeled as WXGA; however, the correct label is WSXGA or WXGA+.

(XGA+) 

XGA+ stands for Extended Graphics Array Plus and is a computer display standard, usually understood to refer to the  resolution with an aspect ratio of 4:3. Until the advent of widescreen LCDs, XGA+ was often used on 17-inch desktop CRT monitors. It is the highest 4:3 resolution not greater than 2 pixels (≈1.05 megapixels), with its horizontal dimension a multiple of 32 pixels. This enables it to fit closely into a video memory or framebuffer of 1MB (1 × 2 bytes), assuming the use of one byte per pixel. The common multiple of 32 pixels constraint is related to alignment.

Historically, the resolution also relates to the earlier standard of  pixels, which was adopted by Sun Microsystems for the Sun-2 workstation in the early 1980s. These resolutions are even closer to the limit of a 1MB framebuffer, but their aspect ratios differ slightly from the common 4:3.

XGA+ is the next step after XGA, although it is not approved by any standard organizations.

(WXGA+, WSXGA) 
Occasionally manufacturers use other terms to refer to this resolution. The Standard Panels Working Group refers to the  resolution as WXGA(II).

WSXGA and WXGA+ can be considered enhanced versions of WXGA with more pixels or as widescreen variants of SXGA. The aspect ratios of each are 16:10 (widescreen).

WXGA+ resolution is common in 19-inch widescreen desktop monitors (a very small number of such monitors use WSXGA+), and is also optional, although less common, in laptop LCDs, in sizes ranging from 12.1 to 17 inches.

(SXGA) 
Super XGA (SXGA) is a standard monitor resolution of  pixels. This display resolution is the "next step" above the XGA resolution that IBM developed in 1990.

The  resolution is not the standard 4:3 aspect ratio, but 5:4 (1.25:1 instead of 1.333:1). A standard 4:3 monitor using this resolution will have rectangular rather than square pixels, meaning that unless the software compensates for this the picture will be distorted, causing circles to appear elliptical.

There is a less common  resolution that preserves the common 4:3 aspect ratio. It is sometimes unofficially called SXGA− to avoid confusion with the "standard" SXGA. Elsewhere this 4:3 resolution was also called UVGA (Ultra VGA), or SXVGA (Super eXtended VGA): Since both sides are doubled from VGA the term Quad VGA would be a systematic one, but it is hardly ever used because its initialism QVGA is strongly associated with the alternate meaning Quarter VGA.

SXGA is the most common native resolution of 17-inch and 19-inch LCD monitors. An LCD monitor with SXGA native resolution will typically have a physical 5:4 aspect ratio, preserving a 1:1 pixel aspect ratio.

Sony manufactured a 17-inch CRT monitor with a 5:4 aspect ratio designed for this resolution. It was sold under the Apple brand name.

SXGA is also a popular resolution for cell phone cameras, such as the Motorola Razr and most Samsung and LG phones. Although being taken over by newer UXGA (2.0-megapixel) cameras, the 1.3-megapixel was the most common around 2007.

Any CRT that can run  can also run , which has the standard 4:3 ratio. Some TFT displays do not allow a user to disable this, and will prevent the upper and lower portions of the screen from being used forcing a "letterbox" format when set to a 4:3 ratio.

The  resolution became popular because at 24bit/px color depth it fit well into 4 megabytes of video RAM. At the time, memory was extremely expensive. Using  at 24-bit color depth allowed using 3.75MB of video RAM, fitting nicely with VRAM chip sizes which were available at the time (4MB):
 px × 24bit/px ÷ 8bit/byte ÷ 220byte/MB = 3.75MB

(SXGA+) 
SXGA+ stands for Super Extended Graphics Array Plus and is a computer display standard. An SXGA+ display is commonly used on 14-inch or 15-inch laptop LCD screens with a resolution of  pixels. An SXGA+ display is used on a few 12-inch laptop screens such as the ThinkPad X60 and X61 (both only as tablet) as well as the Toshiba Portégé M200 and M400, but those are far less common. At 14.1 inches, Dell offered SXGA+ on many of the Latitude C-Series laptops, such as the C640, and IBM since the ThinkPad T21. Sony also used SXGA+ in their Z1 series, but no longer produce them as widescreen has become more predominant.

In desktop LCDs, SXGA+ is used on some low-end 20-inch monitors, whereas most of the 20-inch LCDs use UXGA (standard screen ratio), or WSXGA+ (widescreen ratio).

(WSXGA+) 
WSXGA+ stands for Widescreen Super Extended Graphics Array Plus. WSXGA+ displays were commonly used on Widescreen 20-, 21-, and 22-inch LCD monitors from numerous manufacturers (and a very small number of 19-inch widescreen monitors), as well as widescreen 15.4-inch and 17-inch laptop LCD screens like the Thinkpad T61p, the late 17" Apple PowerBook G4 and the unibody Apple 15" MacBook Pro. The resolution is  pixels (1,764,000 pixels) with a 16:10 aspect ratio.

WSXGA+ is the widescreen version of SXGA+, but it is not approved by any organization. The next highest resolution (for widescreen) after it is WUXGA, which is  pixels.

(UXGA, UGA) 
UXGA or UGA is an abbreviation for Ultra Extended Graphics Array referring to a standard monitor resolution of  pixels (totaling 1,920,000 pixels), which is exactly four times the default image resolution of #SVGA (800×600) (totaling 480,000 pixels). Dell Inc. refers to the same resolution of 1,920,000 pixels as UGA. It is generally considered to be the next step above SXGA ( or ), but some resolutions (such as the unnamed  and SXGA+ at ) fit between the two.

UXGA has been the native resolution of many fullscreen monitors of 15 inches or more, including laptop LCDs such as the ones in the IBM ThinkPad A21p, A30p, A31p, T42p, T43p, T60p, Dell Inspiron 8000/8100/8200 and Latitude/Precision equivalents; some Panasonic Toughbook CF-51 models; and the original Alienware Area 51M gaming laptop. However, in more recent times, UXGA is not used in laptops at all but rather in desktop UXGA monitors that have been made in sizes of 20 inches and 21.3 inches. Some 14-inch laptop LCDs with UXGA have also existed (such as the Dell Inspiron 4100), but these are very rare.

(WUXGA) 
WUXGA stands for Widescreen Ultra Extended Graphics Array and is a display resolution of  pixels (2,304,000 pixels) with a 16:10 screen aspect ratio.

The 16:10 aspect ratio (as opposed to the 16:9 used in widescreen televisions) was chosen because this aspect ratio is appropriate for displaying two full pages of text side by side.

WUXGA resolution has a total of 2,304,000 pixels. One frame of uncompressed 8BPC RGB WUXGA is 6.75MiB (6.912MB). Initially, it was available in widescreen CRTs such as the Sony GDM-FW900 and the Hewlett-Packard A7217A (introduced in 2003), and in 17-inch laptops. Most QXGA displays support . WUXGA is also available in some mobile phablet devices such as the Huawei Honor X2 Gem.

The next lower standard resolution (for widescreen) before it is WSXGA+, which is  pixels (1,764,000 pixels, or 30.61% fewer than WUXGA); the next higher resolution widescreen is an unnamed  resolution (supported by the above GDM-FW900 and A7217A) and then the more common WQXGA, which has  pixels (4,096,000 pixels, or 77.78% more than WUXGA).

Quad Extended Graphics Array 

The QXGA, or Quad Extended Graphics Array, display standard is a resolution standard in display technology. Some examples of LCD monitors that have pixel counts at these levels are the Dell 3008WFP, the Apple Cinema Display, the Apple iMac (27-inch 2009–present), the iPad (3rd generation), the iPad Mini 2, and the MacBook Pro (3rd generation). Many standard 21–22-inch CRT monitors and some of the highest-end 19-inch CRTs also support this resolution.

(QWXGA) 

QWXGA (Quad Wide Extended Graphics Array) is a display resolution of  pixels with a 16:9 aspect ratio. A few QWXGA LCD monitors were available in 2009 with 23- and 27-inch displays, such as the Acer B233HU (23-inch) and B273HU (27-inch), the Dell SP2309W, and the Samsung 2343BWX. As of 2011, most  monitors have been discontinued, and as of 2013, no major manufacturer produces monitors with this resolution.

(QXGA) 
QXGA (Quad Extended Graphics Array) is a display resolution of  pixels with a 4:3 aspect ratio. The name comes from it having four times as many pixels as an XGA display. Examples of LCDs with this resolution are the IBM T210 and the Eizo G33 and R31 screens, but in CRT monitors this resolution is much more common; some examples include the Sony F520, ViewSonic G225fB, NEC FP2141SB or Mitsubishi DP2070SB, Iiyama Vision Master Pro 514, and Dell and HP P1230. Of these monitors, none are still in production. A related display size is WQXGA, which is a widescreen version. CRTs offer a way to achieve QXGA cheaply. Models like the Mitsubishi Diamond Pro 2045U and IBM ThinkVision C220P retailed for around US$200, and even higher performance ones like the ViewSonic PerfectFlat P220fB remained under $500. At one time, many off-lease P1230s could be found on eBay for under $150. The LCDs with WQXGA or QXGA resolution typically cost four to five times more for the same resolution. IDTech manufactured a 15-inch QXGA IPS panel, used in the IBM ThinkPad R50p. NEC sold laptops with QXGA screens in 2002–05 for the Japanese market. The iPad (starting from 3rd generation and Mini 2) also has a QXGA display.

(WQXGA) 

WQXGA (Wide Quad Extended Graphics Array) is a display resolution of  pixels with a 16:10 aspect ratio. The name comes from it being a wide version of QXGA and having four times as many pixels as an WXGA display.

To obtain a vertical refresh rate higher than 40Hz with DVI, this resolution requires dual-link DVI cables and devices. To avoid cable problems monitors are sometimes shipped with an appropriate dual link cable already plugged in. Many video cards support this resolution. One feature that is currently unique to the 30-inch WQXGA monitors is the ability to function as the centerpiece and main display of a three-monitor array of complementary aspect ratios, with two UXGA 20-inch monitors turned vertically on either side. The resolutions are equal, and the size of the 1600 resolution edges (if the manufacturer is honest) is within a tenth of an inch (16-inch vs. 15.89999"), presenting a "picture window view" without the extreme lateral dimensions, small central panel, asymmetry, resolution differences, or dimensional difference of other three-monitor combinations. The resulting  composite image has a 3.1:1 aspect ratio. This also means one UXGA 20-inch monitor in portrait orientation can also be flanked by two 30-inch WQXGA monitors for a  composite image with an 11.85:3 (79:20, 3.95:1) aspect ratio. Some WQXGA medical displays (such as the Barco Coronis 4MP or the Eizo SX3031W) can also be configured as two virtual  or  seamless displays by using both DVI ports at the same time.

An early consumer WQXGA monitor was the 30-inch Apple Cinema Display, unveiled by Apple in June 2004. At the time, dual-link DVI was uncommon on consumer hardware, so Apple partnered with Nvidia to develop a special graphics card that had two dual-link DVI ports, allowing simultaneous use of two 30-inch Apple Cinema Displays. The nature of this graphics card, being an add-in AGP card, meant that the monitors could only be used in a desktop computer, like the Power Mac G5, that could have the add-in card installed, and could not be immediately used with laptop computers that lacked this expansion capability.

In March 2009, Apple updated several Macintosh computers with a Mini DisplayPort adapter, such as the Mac mini and iMac. These allow an external connection to 2560x1600 display.

In 2010, WQXGA made its debut in a handful of home theater projectors targeted at the Constant Height Screen application market. Both Digital Projection Inc and projectiondesign released models based on a Texas Instruments DLP chip with a native WQXGA resolution, alleviating the need for an anamorphic lens to achieve 1:2.35 image projection. Many manufacturers have 27–30-inch models that are capable of WQXGA, albeit at a much higher price than lower resolution monitors of the same size. Several mainstream WQXGA monitors are or were available with 30-inch displays, such as the Dell 3007WFP-HC, 3008WFP, U3011, U3014, UP3017, the Hewlett-Packard LP3065, the Gateway XHD3000, LG W3000H, and the Samsung 305T. Specialist manufacturers like NEC, Eizo, Planar Systems, Barco (LC-3001), and possibly others offer similar models. As of 2016, LG Display make a 10-bit 30-inch AH-IPS panel, with wide color gamut, used in monitors from Dell, NEC, HP, Lenovo and Iiyama.

Released in November 2012, Google's Nexus 10 is the first consumer tablet to feature WQXGA resolution. Before its release, the highest resolution available on a tablet was QXGA, available on the Apple iPad 3rd and 4th generations devices. Several Samsung Galaxy tablets, including the Note 10.1 (2014 Edition), Tab S 8.4, 10.5 and TabPRO 8.4, 10.1 and Note Pro 12.2, as well as the Gigaset QV1030, also feature a WQXGA resolution display.

In 2012, Apple released the 13 inch MacBook Pro with Retina Display that features a WQXGA display, and the new MacBook Air in 2018.

The LG Gram 17 introduced in 2019 uses a 17-inch WQXGA display. It has been updated with the LG Gram 2021 that retains the same screen size and resolution.

(QSXGA) 
QSXGA (Quad Super Extended Graphics Array) is a display resolution of  pixels with a 5:4 aspect ratio. Grayscale monitors with a  resolution, primarily for medical use, are available from Planar Systems (Dome E5), Eizo (Radiforce G51), Barco (Nio 5, MP), WIDE (IF2105MP), IDTech (IAQS80F), and possibly others.

These are driven by two dual-link DVI or DisplayPort outputs. They can be considered to be two seamless virtual QSXGA displays as they have to be driven simultaneously by both dual-link DVI or DisplayPort since one dual-link DVI or DisplayPort cannot single-handedly display 10 megapixels.

(WQSXGA) 
WQSXGA (Wide Quad Super Extended Graphics Array) describes a display standard that can support a resolution up to  pixels, assuming a 1.5625:1 (25:16) aspect ratio. The Coronis Fusion 6MP DL by Barco supports  (approximately 16:10).

(QUXGA) 
QUXGA (Quad Ultra Extended Graphics Array) describes a display standard that can support a resolution up to  pixels, assuming a 4:3 aspect ratio.

(WQUXGA) 
WQUXGA (Wide Quad Ultra Extended Graphics Array) describes a display standard that supports a resolution of  pixels, which provides a 16:10 aspect ratio. This resolution is exactly four times  (in pixels). Dell uses the term "UHD+" to refer to this resolution.

Most display cards with a DVI connector are capable of supporting the  resolution. However, the maximum refresh rate will be limited by the number of DVI links connected to the monitor. 1, 2, or 4 DVI connectors are used to drive the monitor using various tile configurations. Only the IBM T221-DG5 and IDTech MD22292B5 support the use of dual-link DVI ports through an external converter box. Many systems using these monitors use at least two DVI connectors to send video to the monitor. These DVI connectors can be from the same graphics card, different graphics cards, or even different computers. Motion across the tile boundary(ies) can show tearing if the DVI links are not synchronized. The display panel can be updated at a speed between 0Hz and 41Hz (48Hz for the IBM T221-DG5, -DGP, and IDTech MD22292B5). The refresh rate of the video signal can be higher than 41Hz (or 48Hz) but the monitor will not update the display any faster even if graphics card(s) do so.

In June 2001, WQUXGA was introduced in the IBM T220 LCD monitor using a LCD panel built by IDTech. LCD displays that support WQUXGA resolution include: IBM T220, IBM T221, Iiyama AQU5611DTBK, ViewSonic VP2290, ADTX MD22292B, and IDTech MD22292 (models B0, B1, B2, B5, C0, C2). IDTech was the original equipment manufacturer which sold these monitors to ADTX, IBM, Iiyama, and ViewSonic. However, none of the WQUXGA monitors (IBM, ViewSonic, Iiyama, ADTX) are in production anymore: they had prices that were well above even the higher end displays used by graphic professionals, and the lower refresh rates, 41Hz and 48Hz, made them less attractive for many applications.

Unsystematic resolutions 

After having used VGA-based 3:2 resolutions HVGA (480 × 320) and Retina DVGA (960 × 640) for several years in their iPhone and iPod products with a screen diagonal of 9 cm or 3.5 inches, Apple started using more exotic variants when they adopted the 16:9 aspect ratio to provide a consistent pixel density across screen sizes: first 1136 × 640 (rarely: WDVGA) with the iPhone 5, 5C, 5S and SE 1st for 10-cm or 4-inch screens, and later 1334 × 750 with the iPhone 6, 6S, 7, 8, SE 2nd and SE 3rd for 12-cm or 4.7-inch screens, while devices with 14-cm or 5.5-inch screens used standard 1920 × 1080 with the iPhone 6 Plus, 6S Plus, 7 Plus and 8 Plus. The iPhone X, XS and 11 Pro introduced a 2436 × 1125 resolution for 15-cm or 5.8-inch screens, while the iPhone XS Max and 11 Pro Max introduced a 2688 × 1242 resolution for 17-cm or 6.5-inch screens (with a notch) all at an aspect ratio of roughly 13:6 or, for marketing, 19.5:9.

Other manufacturers have also introduced phones with irregular display resolutions and aspect ratios, e.g. Samsung's various Infinity displays with 37:18 = :9 (Galaxy S8/S9 and A8/A9), i.e. 2960 × 1440 (Quad HD+, WQHD+) or 2220 × 1080 (Full HD+), and 19:9 (S10) aspect ratios: 3040 × 1440 and 2280 × 1080 (S10e).

Some air traffic control monitors use displays with a resolution of 2048 x 2048, with an aspect ratio of 1:1, and similar consumer monitors at resolution of 1920 x 1920 are also available aimed primarily at productivity tasks. Eizo is major supplier of panels and monitors in this aspect ratio. Also in 2022, a 16:18 monitor (in 2560x2880 resolution, named SDQHD) was released for general productivity work by LG Electronics.

See also 
 Dot pitch
 List of common resolutions
 Pixel density
 Ultrawide formats for history and comparison of video formats and displays, which are growing wider

References 

Computer display standards